The Presbyterian Reformed Church (PRC) is a North American Christian denomination which was founded in Ontario, Canada on November 17, 1965, when two existing congregations, with similar Scottish Presbyterian roots, came together under a Basis of Union drafted by Prof. John Murray of Westminster Theological Seminary, Philadelphia, PA.

As described in the Basis of Union, the PRC believes in the inspiration and infallibility of the Bible.  Its doctrinal subordinate standards are the Westminster Confession of Faith  (the 1646 edition, approved by the Church of Scotland in 1647), the Westminster Larger Catechism, and the Westminster Shorter Catechism.  Holding to the simplicity of worship reflected in the Westminster Directory of Public Worship, the PRC sings psalms, exclusively and without instrumental accompaniment, in its services.  The Psalter used is the Scottish Metrical Psalter of 1650; the pulpit Bible is the Authorised (King James) Version.  The denomination is Presbyterian in government.

The PRC's terms of communion are, a credible profession of the Christian Faith for membership; and strict subscription to the Westminster Confession of Faith and Catechisms and a personal commitment to the present worship and government of the denomination for office-bearers.

History

Chesley
The beginnings of Presbyterian Reformed Church can be located at Chesley, Ontario, Canada.

In 1873, Rev. Thomas Hannah led a congregation near Williamsford and created the United Presbyterian Church. The church was received in 1912 by the Free Presbyterian Church of Scotland, which provided a pastor. By this time, the Presbyterian church in North America had spread to several locations including Lochalsh, in Huron County, Ontario, Kincardine, Ontario, as well as East Williams and Brucefield, Ontario. In 1918, the scattered congregations were recognized as the Ontario congregation of the Free Presbyterian Church of Scotland.

The Free Presbyterian Church of Scotland sent pastor William Matheson. Matheson grew up in Lochalsh, Ontario but went to Scotland to train and study ministry through the Free Presbyterian Church of Scotland. During his stay in Scotland, Matheson befriended John Murray, who began to attend Princeton Seminary in 1924. During this time, a controversy broke out in the Free Presbyterian Church of Scotland. The church's Synod decided that the use of public transportation to attend service went against the Sabbath. Matheson and Murray claimed otherwise and were cut off from the Free Presbyterian Church of Scotland. As a result, Murray was denied ordination by the Church and instead chose to accept a call to teach at Princeton. In 1937, he was ordained through the Orthodox Presbyterian Church.

Matheson became involved with the congregations at Chesley and Lochalsh, as well as the congregations in Bruce, Huron, and Elgin countries  Ontario until his death in 1957. The Chesley congregation eventually began the Presbyterian Reformed Church under the guidance of Murray. Murray conducted Matheson's funeral and later retired in 1968. He returned to Scotland and died in 1975.

Growth

In 1976 Dr. William Young, an acquaintance of John Murray, joined the presbytery and began serving a congregation at Seekonk, Massachusetts. This congregation became the Presbyterian Reformed Church in 1978. After the death of John Murray, Dr. David Freeman took over preaching duties in Chesley. In 1979, the presbytery organized a congregation under pastor Harry Grimes which no longer exists.

In 1992, the presbytery received Trinity Reformed Church from Des Moines, Iowa. In 2001, Michael J. Ericson was installed as the pastor. In 1996, a congregation was organized in Portland, Oregon with D. Douglas Gebbie as the pastor. In 1998, a congregation was organized in Charlotte, North Carolina, led by pastor Timothy J. Worrell until 2013 . After initiating Bible studies in 2012, a congregation was organized in Jasper, Indiana in 2015. The Jasper congregation is led by pastor Brad Freeman. 

There are also congregations in Rhode Island and in Stockton-on-Tees, England.

References

External links

Stockton Presbyterian Reformed Church in England

Christian organizations established in 1965
Presbyterian denominations in the United States
Presbyterian denominations in Canada
Presbyterian denominations established in the 20th century
Evangelical denominations in North America